Cléber Manuel Chalá Herrón (born June 29, 1971 in Imbabura) is a retired Ecuadorian football midfielder who played 86 games for the Ecuador national team between 1992 and 2004.

Club career
At club level he has played mostly for Nacional Quito where he has made over 450 appearances and participated in 4 Ecuadorian league championship winning campaigns (1992, 1996, 2005A & 2006).

He has also played club football for Deportivo Quito and Universidad San Martín de Porres in Peru. He also had a spell in England with Southampton but never played in the first team. He was signed along with fellow countryman Agustín Delgado, but neither made an impact in English football.

International career
Chalá played for Ecuador at the 2002 FIFA World Cup and in the 1993 Copa América, 1997 Copa América and 2001 Copa América

Personal life
He was father-in-law to fellow Ecuadorian footballer Christian Benítez, who married Chalá's daughter Lizeth in 2007.

References

External links
 Cleber Chala Career Profile
Copa America 2004 profile 

1971 births
Living people
People from Imbabura Province
Ecuadorian footballers
Ecuador international footballers
1993 Copa América players
1997 Copa América players
2001 Copa América players
2002 CONCACAF Gold Cup players
2002 FIFA World Cup players
2004 Copa América players
C.D. El Nacional footballers
Southampton F.C. players
S.D. Quito footballers
Club Deportivo Universidad de San Martín de Porres players
Ecuadorian expatriate footballers
Expatriate footballers in England
Expatriate footballers in Peru
Association football midfielders